John Hannah, VC (27 November 1921 – 7 June 1947) was a Scottish airman and a recipient of the Victoria Cross, the highest award for gallantry in the face of the enemy that can be awarded to British and Commonwealth forces.

Early life
Born in Paisley and educated at Bankhead Primary School and Victoria Drive Secondary School, Glasgow, Hannah joined the Royal Air Force (RAF) in 1939. After training as a wireless operator was promoted to sergeant in 1940. He was posted to No. 83 Squadron, flying Handley Page Hampden bombers as a wireless operator/gunner.

Victoria Cross

On 15 September 1940 over Antwerp, Belgium, after a successful attack on German barges, the Handley Page Hampden bomber (serial P1355) in which Sergeant Hannah was wireless operator/air gunner, was subjected to intense anti-aircraft fire, starting a fire which spread quickly. The rear gunner and navigator had to bail out and Sergeant Hannah could have acted likewise, but instead he remained to fight the fire, first with two extinguishers and then with his bare hands. He sustained terrible injuries, but succeeded in putting out the fire and the pilot was able to bring the almost wrecked aircraft back safely.

The Canadian pilot of the aircraft, Flying Officer Clare Connor, recommended Hannah receive the Victoria Cross. Connor himself was awarded the Distinguished Flying Cross. King George VI presented the decorations to Hannah and Connor at an investiture in Buckingham Palace.

Eighteen years old at the time of his Victoria Cross action, Hannah was the youngest recipient of the medal for aerial operations and the youngest for the Second World War.

Victoria Cross citation
The announcement and accompanying citation for the Victoria Cross was published in supplement to the London Gazette on 1 October 1940, reading

Later life and death

Hannah contracted tuberculosis only a year later in mid-late 1941; it is likely that his weakened condition following the severe burns he sustained during his Victoria Cross action undermined his resistance to infection. His illness necessitated his eventual discharge from the RAF, with full disability pension, in December 1942. However, unable thereafter to take up a full-time job, he initially took a job as a taxi driver (using a car his aunt had lent him) but due to increasing ill health he returned the car in 1943. He then found it increasingly difficult to support his wife and three small daughters, and his health ultimately gave out. He died on 7 June 1947 at Markfield Sanatorium in Leicester, where he had been lying for four months. He is buried in the churchyard of St James the Great Church, Church Hill, Birstall, north Leicester. His wife, Janet Hannah, is also interred there with her husband. An inscription to her reads "Loved and remembered always Janet Hannah Aged 83 years".

Hannah's headstone is inscribed: "Courageous Duty Done In Love, He Serves His Pilot Now Above." His Victoria Cross is displayed at the Royal Air Force Museum, Hendon, London.

References

External links
Sergeant J. Hannah in The Art of War exhibition at the UK National Archives
Location of grave and VC medal (Leicestershire)

1921 births
1947 deaths
Burials in Leicestershire
Military personnel from Paisley, Renfrewshire
British World War II recipients of the Victoria Cross
Royal Air Force personnel of World War II
Royal Air Force airmen
Scottish airmen
Royal Air Force recipients of the Victoria Cross
British taxi drivers